Mundi Kasu is a village in Shahkot in Jalandhar district of Punjab State, India. The village is administrated by a sarpanch who is an elected representative of village as per Panchayati raj (India).

Population
According to 2011 census report  Mundi Kasu has 19 households with the total population of 117 persons of which 57 are male and 60 are female. The total population of children in the age group 0-6 is 7.

Transport 
Shahkot Malisian station is the nearest train station.

References 

Villages in Jalandhar district